Alfred Lichtenstein  may refer to:

 Alfred Lichtenstein (philatelist) (1876-1947), American philatelist
 Alfred Lichtenstein (writer) (1889-1914), German writer